Australia competed at the 1988 Summer Olympics in Seoul, South Korea. 252 competitors, 180 men and 72 women, took part in 145 events in 24 sports. Australian athletes have competed in every Summer Olympic Games of the modern era.

Medalists

Competitors
The following is the list of number of competitors in the Games.

Archery

In the fifth Olympic archery competition that Australia contested, the nation sent only men.  They were not successful, with Simon Fairweather's 16th place the best ranking any individual received.  The Australians did not qualify for the team semifinal.

Men

Athletics

Men's Competition
Men's 200m 
 Mark Garner
 Heat – 21.09
 Quarterfinals – 21.08 (→ did not advance, 26th place)

Men's 400m 
 Robert Stone
 Heat – 46.52
 Quarterfinals – 46.04 (→ did not advance, 25th place)
 Miles Murphy
 Heat – 46.38
 Quarterfinals – 45.93 (→ did not advance, 23rd place)

Men's 1,500m 
 Pat Scammel
 Heat – 3:45.21 (→ did not advance, 35th place)

Men's 5,000m 
 Andrew Lloyd
 Heat – 13:47.87
 Semifinals – 13:42.49 (→ did not advance, 24th place)

Men's 10,000m 
 Andrew Lloyd
 Heat – did not finish (→ did not advance, no ranking)

Men's Marathon 
 Steve Moneghetti
 Final – 2"11.49 (→ 5th place)
 Robert De Castella
 Final – 2"13.07 (→ 8th place)
 Bradley Camp
 Final – 2"23.49 (→ 41st place)

Men's 4 × 400 m Relay 
 Robert Ballard, Mark Garner, Leigh Miller, and Miles Murphy
 Heat – 3:05.93
 Miles Murphy, Mark Garner, Robert Ballard, and Darren Clark
 Semi-final – 3:06.63
 Robert Ballard, Mark Garner, Miles Murphy, and Darren Clark
 Final – 3:02.49 (→ 6th place)

Men's 400m Hurdles 
 Leigh Miller
 Heat – 50.53 (→ did not advance, 21st place)

Men's Long Jump 
 David Culbert
 Qualification – 7.64m (→ did not advance)

Men's Decathlon 
 Simon Shirley – 8036 points (→ 15th place)
 100 metres – 11.03s
 Long Jump – 7.45m
 Shot Put – 14.20m
 High Jump – 1.97m
 400 metres – 48.84s
 110m Hurdles – 15.44s
 Discus Throw – 41.68m
 Pole Vault – 4.70m
 Javelin Throw – 64.00m
 1.500 metres – 4:27.48s

Men's 20 km Walk
 Simon Baker
 Final – 1:21:47.0 (→ 11th place)
 Andrew Jachno
 Final – 1:24:52.0 (→ 28th place)

Men's 50 km Walk
 Simon Baker
 Final – 3:44:07.0 (→ 6th place)
 Andrew Jachno
 Final – 3:53:23.0 (→ 19th place)

Men's Discus Throw
 Werner Reiterer
 Qualification – 59.78m (→ did not advance, 15th place)

Women's Competition
Women's 100m 
 Kerry Johnson
 Heat – 11.44
 Quarterfinals – 11.42 (→ did not advance, 24th place)

Women's 200m 
 Kerry Johnson
 Heat – 23.20
 Quarterfinals – 23.01 (→ did not advance, 18th place)

Women's 400m 
 Maree Holland
 Heat – 52.29
 Quarterfinals – 50.90
 Semifinals – 50.24
 Final – 51.25 (→ 8th place)

Women's 3,000m 
 Jackie Perkins
 Heat – 9:01.82 (→ did not advance, 22nd place)

Women's 10,000m 
 Carolyn Schuwalow
 Heat – 32:10.05
 Final – 32:45.07 (→ 17th place)
 Jackie Perkins
 Heat – 33:45.22 (→ did not advance, 31st place)

Women's 4 × 400 m Relay 
 Debbie Flintoff-King, Maree Holland, Kerry Johnson, and Jenny Laurendet
 Heat – did not start (→ no ranking)

Women's Marathon 
 Lisa Martin
 Final – 2:25:53 (→  Silver Medal)

Women's 100m Hurdles 
 Jane Flemming
 Heat – 13.53
 Quarterfinals – did not start (→ did not advance, no ranking)

Women's 400m Hurdles 
 Debbie Flintoff-King
 Heat – 54.99
 Semifinals – 54.00
 Final – 53.17 (→  Gold Medal)
 Sally Fleming
 Heat – 56.08 (→ did not advance, 19th place)
 Jenny Laurendet
 Heat – 56.44 (→ did not advance, 21st place)

Women's High Jump 
 Christine Stanton
 Qualification – 1.92m
 Final – 1.93m (→ 7th place)
 Vanessa Browne
 Qualification – 1.90m (→ did not advance, 13th place)

Women's Long Jump 
 Nicole Boegman
 Qualification – 6.72m
 Final – 6.73m (→ 5th place)

Women's Heptathlon 
 Jane Flemming
 final result – 6351 points (→ 7th place)

Basketball

Summary

Men's tournament

Team roster

Group play

Quarterfinals

Semifinals

Bronze medal match

Women's tournament

Team roster

Group play

Semifinals

Bronze medal match

Boxing

Canoeing

Cycling

Seventeen cyclists, thirteen men and four women, represented Australia in 1988.

Men's road race
 Edward Salas
 Stephen Fairless
 Scott Steward

Men's team time trial
 Stephen Fairless
 Bruce Keech
 Clayton Stevenson
 Scott Steward

Men's sprint
 Gary Neiwand

Men's 1 km time trial
 Martin Vinnicombe

Men's individual pursuit
 Dean Woods

Men's team pursuit
 Brett Dutton
 Wayne McCarney
 Stephen McGlede
 Dean Woods
 Scott McGrory

Men's points race
 Robert Burns

Women's road race
 Elizabeth Hepple – 2:00:52 (→ 22nd place)
 Donna Gould – 2:00:52 (→ 27th place)
 Kathleen Shannon – 2:00:52 (→ 29th place)

Women's sprint
 Julie Speight

Diving

Equestrianism

Fencing

Two fencers, one man and one woman, represented Australia in 1988.

Men's foil
 Robert Davidson

Men's épée
 Robert Davidson

Women's foil
 Andrea Chaplin

Football

Gymnastics

Hockey

Men's team competition
 Preliminary round (Group A)
 Australia – Kenya 7–1
 Australia – Argentina 4–0
 Australia – Netherlands 3–2
 Australia – Pakistan 4–0
 Australia – Spain 1–0
 Semi-finals
 Australia – Great Britain 2–3
 Bronze Medal Game
 Australia – Netherlands 1–2 (→ Fourth place)
 Team Roster
 ( 1.) Craig Davies (captain)
 ( 2.) Colin Batch
 ( 3.) John Bestall
 ( 4.) Warren Birmingham
 ( 5.) Ric Charlesworth
 ( 6.) Andrew Deane
 ( 7.) Michael York
 ( 8.) Mark Hager
 ( 9.) Jay Stacy
 (10.) Neil Hawgood
 (11.) Peter Noel (goalkeeper)
 (12.) Graham Reid
 (13.) Roger Smith
 (14.) Neil Snowden (goalkeeper)
 (15.) David Wansbrough
 (16.) Ken Wark
Head coach: Richard Aggiss

Women's team competition
 Preliminary round (Group B)
 Australia – Canada 1–1
 Australia – West Germany 1–0
 Australia – South Korea 5–5
 Semi-finals
 Australia – The Netherlands 3–2
 Final
 Australia – South Korea 2–0 (→ Gold Medal)
 Team Roster
 ( 1.) Kathleen Partridge (goalkeeper)
 ( 2.) Elsbeth Clement
 ( 3.) Liane Tooth
 ( 4.) Loretta Dorman
 ( 5.) Lorraine Hillas
 ( 6.) Michelle Capes
 ( 7.) Sandra Pisani
 ( 8.) Deborah Bowman (captain)
 ( 9.) Lee Capes
 (10.) Kim Small
 (11.) Sally Carbon
 (12.) Jackie Pereira
 (13.) Tracey Belbin
 (14.) Rechelle Hawkes
 (15.) Sharon Buchanan
 (16.) Maree Fish (goalkeeper)
Head coach: Brian Glencross

Judo

Modern pentathlon

One male pentathlete represented Australia in 1988.

Men's Individual Competition:
 Alexander Watson – 0 pt, 64th place

Men's team competition:
 Watson – 0 pt, 64th place

Rowing

Ion Popa

Sailing

Shooting

Swimming

Men's 50 m Freestyle
 Andrew Baildon
 Heat – 22.99
 Final – 23.15 (→ 8th place)
 Tom Stachewicz
 Heat – 23.72 (→ did not advance, 27th place)

Men's 100 m Freestyle
 Andrew Baildon
 Heat – 50.34
 Final – 50.23 (→ 6th place)
 Tom Stachewicz
 Heat – 50.90
 B-Final – 50.71 (→ 9th place)

Men's 200 m Freestyle
 Duncan Armstrong
 Heat – 1:48.86
 Final – 1:47.25 (→  Gold Medal)
 Tom Stachewicz
 Heat – 1:51.02
 B-Final – 1:50.83 (→ 11th place)

Men's 400 m Freestyle
 Duncan Armstrong
 Heat – 3:50.64
 Final – 3:47.15 (→  Silver Medal)
 Ian Brown
 Heat – 3:51.09
 B-Final – 3:54.63 (→ 13th place)

Men's 1500 m Freestyle
 Michael Bruce McKenzie
 Heat – 15:19.36 (→ did not advance, 11th place)
 Jason Plummer
 Heat – 15:22.85 (→ did not advance, 14th place)

Men's 100 m Backstroke
 Carl Wilson
 Heat – 58.40 (→ did not advance, 27th place)
 Simon Upton
 Heat – 59.06 (→ did not advance, 32nd place)

Men's 200 m Backstroke
 Simon Upton
 Heat – 2:05.08 (→ did not advance, 22nd place)

Men's 100 m Breaststroke
 Ian McAdam
 Heat – 1:04.56 (→ did not advance, 22nd place)

Men's 200 m Breaststroke
 Ian McAdam
 Heat – 2:19.68 (→ did not advance, 21st place)

Men's 100 m Butterfly
 Jon Sieben
 Heat – 53.85
 Final – 53.33 (→ 4th place)
 David Wilson
 Heat – 55.54 (→ did not advance, 20th place)

Men's 200 m Butterfly
 David Wilson
 Heat – 1:59.02
 Final – 1:59.20 (→ 6th place)
 Martin Roberts
 Heat – 2:00.32
 B-Final – 2:04.28 (→ 16th place)

Men's 200 m Individual Medley
 Robert Bruce
 Heat – 2:04.31
 Final – 2:04.34 (→ 6th place)
 Rob Woodhouse
 Heat 8 – 2:05.87 (→ did not advance, 17th place)

Men's 400 m Individual Medley
 Robert Bruce
 Heat – 4:25.15
 B-Final – 4:24.33 (→ 11th place)
 Rob Woodhouse
 Heat 5 – 4:25.60
 B-Final – 4:26.14 (→ 14th place)

Men's 4 × 200 m Freestyle Relay
 Jason Plummer, Ian Brown, Martin Roberts, and Tom Stachewicz
 Heat – 7:21.46
 Tom Stachewicz, Ian Brown, Jason Plummer, and Duncan Armstrong
 Final – 7:15.23 (→ 4th place)

Men's 4 × 100 m Medley Relay
 Carl Wilson, Ian McAdam, Jon Sieben, and Andrew Baildon
 Heat – 3:47.40
 Final – 3:45.85 (→ 6th place)

Women's 50 m Freestyle
 Karen van Wirdum
 Heat – 26.12
 Final – 26.01 (→ 8th place)

Women's 100 m Freestyle
 Karen van Wirdum
 Heat – 56.84
 B-Final – 57.04 (→ 14th place)
 Susanne Baumer
 Heat – 57.76 (→ did not advance, 22nd place)

Women's 200 m Freestyle
 Sheridan Burge-Lopez
 Heat – 2:03.42 (→ did not advance, 20th place)
 Susanne Baumer
 Heat – 2:04.82 (→ did not advance, 26th place)

Women's 400 m Freestyle
 Janelle Elford
 Heat – 4:11.07
 Final – 4:10.64 (→ 5th place)
 Sheridan Burge-Lopez
 Heat – 4:12.77
 B-Final – 4:10.21 (→ 9th place)

Women's 800 m Freestyle
 Julie McDonald
 Heat – 8:29.68
 Final – 8:22.93 (→  Bronze Medal)
 Janelle Elford
 Heat – 8:32.14
 B-Final – 8:30.94 (→ 6th place)

Women's 100 m Backstroke
 Nicole Livingstone
 Heat – 1:03.26
 Final – 1:04.15 (→ 7th place)
 Karen Lord
 Heat – 1:04.69 (→ did not advance, 16th place)

Women's 200 m Backstroke
 Nicole Livingstone
 Heat – 2:14.81
 Final – 2:13.43 (→ 5th place)
 Karen Lord
 Heat – 2:16.94 (→ did not advance, 16th place)
 B-Final – 2:18.78 (→ 14th place)

Women's 100 m Breaststroke
 Lara Hooiveld
 Heat – 1:11.40
 B-Final – 1:11.26 (→ 15th place)

Women's 200 m Breaststroke
 Lara Hooiveld
 Heat – 2:39.97 (→ did not advance, 30th place)

Women's 100 m Butterfly
 Fiona Alessandri
 Heat – 1:01.90
 B-Final – 1:02.51 (→ 13th place)

Women's 200 m Butterfly
 Donna Procter
 Heat – 2:18.17 (→ did not advance, 17th place)

Women's 200 m Individual Medley
 Jodie Clatworthy
 Heat – 2:17.29
 Final – 2:16.31 (→ 4th place)
 Donna Procter
 Heat – 2:21.79 (→ 19th place)

Women's 400 m Individual Medley
 Jodie Clatworthy
 Heat – 4:44.26
 Final – 4:45.86 (→ 6th place)
 Donna Procter
 Heat – 4:47.57
 Final – 4:47.51 (→ 8th place)

Women's 4 × 100 m Medley Relay
 Nicole Livingstone, Lara Hooiveld, Fiona Alessandri and Karen van Wirdum
 Heat – 4:14.32
 Final – 4:11.57 (→ 4th place)

Synchronized swimming

Two synchronized swimmers represented Australia in 1988.

Women's solo
 Lisa Lieschke
 Semon Rohloff

Women's duet
 Lisa Lieschke
 Semon Rohloff

Table tennis

Tennis

Men's Singles Competition
 John Fitzgerald
 First round – Lost to Grant Connell (Canada) 6-6 6-4 2-6 2-6
 Wally Masur
 First round – Defeated Luiz Mattar (Brazil) 6-4 6-4 4-6 6-7 6-4
 Second round – Lost to Carl-Uwe Steeb (West Germany) 3-6 7-5 3-6 6-1 5-7

Men's Doubles Competition
 Darren Cahill and John Fitzgerald
 First round – Defeated Anastasios Bavelas and George Kalovelonis (Greece) 6-2 4-6 6-1 6-1
 Second round – Defeated Bruce Derlin and Kelly Evernden (New Zealand) 6-7 6-4 6-2 3-6 6-1
 Quarterfinals – Lost to Stefan Edberg and Anders Järryd (Sweden) 3-6 4-6 3-6

Women's Singles Competition
Anne Minter
 First round – Defeated Xochitl Escobedo (Mexico) 6-1 6-3
 Second round – Lost to Natasha Zvereva (Soviet Union) 4-6 6-3 1-6
Elizabeth Smylie
 First round – Lost to Raffaella Reggi (Italy) 6-7 0-6
Wendy Turnbull
 First round – Defeated Clare Wood (Great Britain) 6-1 6-3
 Second round – Lost to Natasha Zvereva (Soviet Union) 4-6 6-3 1-6

Water polo

Men's team competition
 Preliminary round (Group A)
 Lost to West Germany (11-13)
 Lost to Soviet Union (4-11)
 Lost to Italy (5-7)
 Defeated France (7-6)
 Defeated South Korea (13-2)
 Classification Round (Group D)
 Defeated Spain (8-7)
 Lost to Hungary (5-13) → 8th place
 Team Roster
 Glenn Townsend
 Richard Pengelley
 Christopher Harrison
 Troy Stockwell
 Andrew Wightman
 Andrew Kerr
 Raymond Mayers
 Geoffrey Clark
 John Fox
 Christopher Wybrow
 Simon Asher
 Andrew Taylor
 Donald Cameron
Head coach: Tom Hoad

Weightlifting

Wrestling

See also
Australia at the 1986 Commonwealth Games
Australia at the 1990 Commonwealth Games

References

Nations at the 1988 Summer Olympics
1988
Olympics